CC & Lee is a band from Sweden, established in 2003. Their major breakthrough was Dansbandskampen 2008. In November 2011, it was announced that the band would no longer appear as a dansband.

Members 
Cecilia "CC" Furlong - Vocals
Lena "Lee" Ström - Vocals
Robert Furlong - Guitar
Henrik Ström - Piano
Roger Holmberg - Bass
Daniel Uhlas - Drums

Discography

Studio albums 
 2009: Gåva till dig

Singles 
 2009: Himlen kan vänta
 2009: Leende guldbruna ögon
 2009: Leende guldbruna ögon (Perra remix)
 2009: Kan du se genom tårarna
 2010: Honey

References

External links
 Official website
 CC & Lee at Facebook
 CC & Lee at Myspace

2003 establishments in Sweden
Dansbands
Musical groups established in 2003
Musical groups from Malmö